Historically Nahuatl has been written with greatly differing orthographies because no institution has governed its spelling. This is still true for the Classical Nahuatl dialect which is a dead language documented in many historical sources and literature, but spelling of the modern dialects of Nahuatl is governed by the Mexican Secretaría de Educación Publica (federal education ministry), although they do have some difficulties in implementing their orthographic standards in the Nahuatl communities.

This article describes and compares some of the different transcription systems of the Nahuatl phonological system that have been used.

Classical Nahuatl's phonology

Vowels

Consonants

Orthographical history
At the time of the Spanish conquest, Aztec writing used mostly pictographs supplemented by a few ideograms. When needed, it also used syllabic equivalences; Father Diego Durán recorded how the tlàcuilòquê (codex painters) could render a prayer in Latin using this system, but it was difficult to use. This writing system was adequate for keeping such records as genealogies, astronomical information, and tribute lists, but could not represent a full vocabulary of spoken language in the way that the writing systems of the old world or of the Maya civilization could. Aztec writing was not meant to be read, but to be told; the elaborate codices were essentially pictographic aids for teaching, and long texts were memorized.

The Spanish introduced the Latin alphabet, which was then utilized to record a large body of Aztec prose and poetry, a fact which somewhat mitigated the devastating loss of the thousands of Aztec manuscripts which were burned by the Spanish (see Aztec codices). Important lexical works (e.g. Alonso de Molina's classic Vocabulario of 1571) and grammatical descriptions (of which Horacio Carochi's 1645 Arte is generally acknowledged as the best) were produced using variations of this orthography.

Classical Nahuatl orthography was not perfect, and in fact there were many variations in how it was applied, due in part to dialectal differences and in part to differing traditions and preferences that developed. (The writing of Spanish itself was far from totally standardized at the time.) Today, although almost all written Nahuatl uses some form of Latin-based orthography, there continue to be strong dialectal differences, and considerable debate and differing practices regarding how to write sounds even when they are the same. Major issues include:

How to write 
How to write the saltillo. This phoneme was usually not represented in the colonial period, except by Horacio Carochi who represented it with an acute accent over the preceding vowel. Today, in the dialects that pronounce the saltillo as  it is frequently written with j, h. Some neo-classical orthographies use the letter h to represent the glottal stop of classical Nahuatl.
Whether and how to represent vowel length
Whether and how to represent allophones (sound variants), which approximate different Spanish phonemes, especially variants of o which come close to u
To what extent writing in one variant should be adapted towards what is used in other variants.

Historical transcription methodologies

When the Spanish friars began transcribing Nahuatl into the Latin alphabet they, naturally, made use of Spanish language practices as a basis for the Nahuatl script.  While the voiceless postalveolar affricate  (English  sound  as in "church"), the voiceless postalveolar fricative  (English  sound  as in "sure" and "cash"), and the voiceless stops sounded the same in both Spanish and Nahuatl, Spanish lacked the voiceless alveolar affricate , the lateral alveolar affricate , and the glottal stop  (the break between the vowels in English Uh-oh).

Thus, Nahuatl written in the Latin alphabet is very similar to that of Spanish with a few exceptions:

Words are stressed on the second-to-the-last vowel (excluding )
  does not occur as an independent vowel.
 represents  (as it did in Spanish; the Spanish phoneme transcribed with  later shifted to a voiceless velar fricative, now written  in most cases, while the Náhuatl phoneme transcribed with  remained unchanged).
 represents a geminated .
This is a phoneme not found in any European languages but commonly found in indigenous North and Central American languages (similar sounds exist in Welsh and Icelandic).
 and  both represent .
 and  both represent .
 without an adjacent  represents a glottal stop.
 represents  (as in Latin American Spanish or Basque).

In post-colonial times Nahuatl had no standardized orthography, and colonial documents employ widely different orthographies:

 and  both represent .
The glottal stop may or may not be written.
Vowel length may or may not be marked.
 and  may both represent the vowel .
 or  may both represent the consonant .
The letter  may replace  to represent .

Carochi's transcription
In the 17th century the Jesuit grammarian Horacio Carochi wrote a grammar on the Classical Nahuatl language. For this purpose he developed an orthography for Classical Nahuatl, which was exceptional in that it was the first description of Nahuatl that consistently marked both vowel length and glottal stop (saltillo). His orthography was subsequently used in works and documents by some Jesuits but did not gain wide usage since decrees by Charles II banned the use of indigenous languages in his empire and the later expulsion of the Jesuits from New Spain in 1767.

His orthography was further refined by Michel Launey, in his grammar of Classical Nahuatl. The transcription shows vowel length by adding a macron above the long vowel: . Also, it shows saltillo by marking the preceding vowel with a grave accent  if it is medial or a circumflex if it is final . Some other transcriptions mark saltillo as an  because in Classical Nahuatl, the phoneme was pronounced as a glottal stop and not consistently transcribed by any grammarian except Carochi.

Many modern dialects of Nahuatl, however, have  as a phoneme instead of saltillo. Historical sources and transcriptions by many modern scholars do not use any standardized transcriptions and usually do not mark vowel length or saltillo at all, and the reader will have to guess or know vowel length and the presence of saltillo. To give an adequate description of Classical Nahuatl, marking both vowel length and saltillo is, however, essential.

Contemporary orthography
The Secretaría de Educación Pública (Ministry of Public Education) has adopted an alphabet for its bilingual education programs in rural communities in Mexico and this decision has had some influence, even though it is not suited for all dialects of Nahuatl, because of the wide phonological differences between them. The recently established Instituto Nacional de Lenguas Indígenas (National Indigenous Languages Institute, INALI) will also be involved in these issues. This orthography generally does not mark vowel length nor saltillo (but it uses  to represent the sound  in the dialects that have this sound.)

Vowels

Consonants

Notes

References
Canger, Una. 2002. "An Interactive Dictionary and Text Corpus for Sixteenth- and Seventeenth-Century Nahuatl." in  Making Dictionaries - Preserving Indigenous Languages of the Americas. Ed. William Frawley, Kenneth Hill, and Pamela Munro. University of California Press.
Canger, Una. 1990. "Review, An Analytical Dictionary of Nahuatl (Karttunen)". International Journal of American Linguistics 52. 188–196.
Carochi, Horacio. 1645.  Arte de la Lengua Mexicana con la Declaracion de los Adverbios Della (Reprinted Mexico, 1759, 1892). Facsimile edition of Ruyz, Mexico, 1645.
Croft, Kenneth. 1951. "Practical Orthography for Matlapa Nahuatl". International Journal of American Linguistics 17. 32–36.
Launey, M. 1979.  Introduction à la Langue et à la Littérature Aztèques t.1: Grammaire. Paris: L'Harmattan; An Introduction to Classical Nahuatl [English translation/adaptation by Christopher Mackay], 2011, Cambridge University Press.

Orthography
Latin-script orthographies